The School of Information Studies (SIS) at McGill University is engaged in the education of information professionals and scholars, individuals who can make a difference to the management and design of information resources, services, and systems to ensure adequate access to information and knowledge for all.

The School inherits the rich traditions of service from librarianship. As the pioneer school of its kind in Canada, SIS has been offering programs at McGill since 1897, and its Masters program has been continuously accredited by the American Library Association since 1929.

The School is located in a historic building at 3661 Peel Street on the downtown McGill University campus.

Programs 
SIS offers the following graduate-level programs:

 Master of Information Studies (formerly Master of Library and Information Studies) with courses in Library Studies, Knowledge Management, Archival Studies, and Information & Communication Technology. Offered from 2014 onwards. 
 PhD in Information Studies
 Graduate Certificate in Library and Information Studies for post-MLIS (or equivalent Masters) 
 Graduate Certificate in Digital Archives Management
 Graduate Certificate in Information and Knowledge Management

Research 
SIS professors are engaged in the broad research area of Human Information Interaction (HII) with many projects falling in the core research areas: 
 Human-Computer Interaction
 Information Behaviour & Services
 Information & Knowledge Management

The School is home to three affiliated research labs:

 Accessible Computing Technology (ACT) Research Lab
 Data Mining & Security (DMaS) Lab
 Multimodal Interaction Lab (MIL)

History
Following the founding of an apprenticeship-training program in librarianship in 1897, the McGill Summer Library School was formally founded in 1904 under the jurisdiction of the University Library Committee to offer education in library administration. It was the first formal library education program in Canada, and one of the first university programs in librarianship outside of the United States. The School was renamed the Graduate School of Library Science in 1965, the Graduate School of Library and Information Studies in 1985, and the School of Information Studies in 2007.

Notes

External links
 McGill School of Information Studies

Information schools
American Library Association accredited library schools